Araqah is a Palestinian village in the Jenin Governorate in the Northern area of the West Bank, located 15 kilometers West of Jenin. According to the Palestinian Central Bureau of Statistics, the village had a population of over 2,124 inhabitants in mid-year 2006.

History
Pottery remains from the late Roman,  Byzantine,  early Muslim and the Middle Ages have been found here.

Ottoman era
Pottery remains from the early Ottoman era have also been found here.

In 1870, Victor Guérin described it as a small village, situated on a small hill, and divided into two quarters.

In 1882 the PEF's Survey of Western Palestine found that it was "a village of moderated size on a hill side, with a  well to the south."

British Mandate era
In the 1922 census of Palestine, conducted by the British Mandate authorities, the village had a population of 168 Muslims, increasing slightly in the 1931 census  to 219 Muslims, with 36 houses. 

In  1944/5 statistics the population was 350  Muslims, with a total of 5,675  dunams of land, according to an official land and population survey. Of this, 462 dunams were used for  plantations and irrigable land, 1,191  dunams for cereals, while 27 dunams were built-up (urban) land.

Jordanian era
After the 1948 Arab-Israeli War, Araqah came  under Jordanian rule.

The Jordanian census of 1961 found 569 inhabitants.

Post-1967
Araqah has been  under Israeli occupation along with the rest of the West Bank since the 1967 Six-Day War.

On 27 April 2015 an eighteen-year-old youth from the village died after being shot the previous day by Israeli soldiers.

See also
Timeline of the Israeli–Palestinian conflict, 2015

References

Bibliography

External links
 Welcome To 'Araqa
Araqa, Welcome to Palestine
Survey of Western Palestine, Map 8: IAA, Wikimedia commons

Jenin Governorate
Villages in the West Bank
Municipalities of the State of Palestine